Abrus aureus is a plant in the legume family Fabaceae, native to Madagascar. It grows as a herb or liana.

Distribution and habitat
Abrus aureus is endemic to Madagascar, where it is widespread. Its habitat is in forests and agricultural areas, from sea level to  altitude.

Conservation
Abrus aureus is threatened by wildfires. However, its widespread distribution and presence in numerous protected areas has given it an IUCN assessment of Least concern. It is locally used in traditional medicine.

References

Faboideae
Endemic flora of Madagascar
Plants described in 1952